Streamzoo was a photo and video sharing social networking service that came with photo enhancement functionality. The mobile app was compatible with the Apple iPhone and Android-Smartphones, but site users could also access their accounts online.

Streamzoo was taken offline and off of the Apple iPhone and Android-Smartphones on March 21, 2014. All photos were deleted from the server and cannot be retrieved.

Background 

Streamzoo was launched in February 2011 by Phonezoo Communications, Inc., a company founded by Ram Ramkumar and Manish Vaidya, and funded by venture capitalist Tim Draper of DFJ Ventures, Inc.  In September 2011, industry guru Robert Scoble wrote a tweet opining that "These guys have a better camera much better than Instagram". Streamzoo launched v2.0 of the product in late 2011. Streamzoo became the first cross-platform (iOS, Android & web) based photo sharing social network to offer the ability to collect badges as rewards for contributing photos to specific "streams".

Streamzoo shut down, with all services stopping on March 21, 2014.

See also
 List of open source Android applications
 Photo sharing

References

External links
 Official Site
 BuyLikes.net Instagram vs. Streamzoo: It’s Not What You Think
Imageboards
American photography websites